Hussain Saeed Alnahdi was a 24-year-old University of Wisconsin–Stout student from Sharurah, Saudi Arabia, majoring in Business Administration, who was murdered in Menomonie, in Dunn County, Wisconsin, United States, in 2016.

Alnahdi was attacked, beaten and left unconscious outside a pizza restaurant on Main Street East in downtown Menomonie at about 2am on 30 October 2016. He died from his injuries the following day, Monday 31 October, at the Mayo Clinic in Eau Claire, having been taken there by helicopter from the Mayo Clinic Health System in Menomonie.

His body was laid to rest on 7 November in Sharurah, Saudi Arabia.

A reward of $20,000 was offered for information leading to the arrest of his killer.

On 18 November, police in Menomonie announced that they had identified a suspect for the killing, and that there was no evidence that it was a hate crime. On 22 November, they recommended to the Dunn County district attorney's office that the suspect be charged with felony murder and substantial battery. The suspect, whose name was not given, was said to neither be a student of the university nor a resident of Dunn County.

On January 13, 2017, Cullen Osburn was charged with murder of Hussain, and an April 2018 trial was scheduled. In October 2018, a jury found Cullen Osborn guilty of aggravated battery, but acquitted him on the more serious felony murder charge.

The Consulate of the Kingdom of Saudi Arabia in Houston appointed a lawyer to handle all procedural, security, and judicial aspects of the case.

See also
 List of homicides in Wisconsin

References

External links 

 

2016 deaths
Deaths by person in Wisconsin
Dunn County, Wisconsin
Male murder victims
October 2016 crimes in the United States
People from Buraidah
People murdered in Wisconsin
Saudi Arabian expatriates in the United States
Saudi Arabian people murdered abroad
2016 murders in the United States
University of Wisconsin–Stout